The 2017 Grote Prijs Jef Scherens was the 51st edition of the Grote Prijs Jef Scherens road cycling one day race in and around Leuven It was held on 20 August 2017 as a 1.1 categorised race and was part of the 2017 UCI Europe Tour and the 2017 Belgian Road Cycling Cup.

Timothy Dupont won the race in a bunch sprint. Defending champion Dimitri Claeys was not present as his team  did not take part.

Teams
Twenty teams were invited to take part in the race. These included three UCI WorldTeams, seven UCI Professional Continental teams and twelve UCI Continental teams.

Result

References

External links

Grote Prijs Jef Scherens
2017 UCI Europe Tour
2017 in Belgian sport